Mahmood Ali-Balogun  is a Nigerian filmmaker, cultural worker and the managing director of Brickwall Communications Limited. He directed the multiple award-winning film 'Tango With Me'. He is the Chairman of the Audio Visual Rights Society (AVRS) of Nigeria (2).

Early life and career 
Mahmood Ali-Balogun was born on July 19, 1959 and grew up in Northern Nigeria.  He is an Alumnus of  University of Ife, now the Obafemi Awolowo University where he studied Dramatic Arts specialized in film and television production.  Mahmood's career has evolved over the years from being an actor, to director, producer, industry leader, film consultant and ambassador in the Film making industry. Since 1999 Mahmood has also directed six award winning documentaries.

Filmography

Industry roles 
 Member: Advisory Council for the Nigerian Film Industry 
 Member: Advisory Board, African Movies Academy Awards AMAA
 President: 9th Congress, Federation Panafricaine Des Cineates (FEPACI). South Africa, 2013 
 Current Chairman: Audio Visual Rights Society of Nigeria (AVRS) 
 Founding President: National Association of Nigeria Theatre Arts Practitioners (NANTAP) 
 Former Vice President: Independent Television Producers Association of Nigeria (ITPAN) 
 Panelist: The Toronto International Film Festival, TIFF 2013, Toronto, 2013 
 Advisor: African International Film Festival, AFRIFF
 Ambassador: Nollywood Film Festival in Paris, 2014
 Industry Ambassador: Africa International Film Festival (AFRIFF), Calabar, 2013 
 Jury: 2015 International Emmy Awards
 Jury: Africa International Film Festival (AFRIFF), Calabar, 2014 
 Jury: 32nd Cairo International Film Festival(CIFF),
 Panelist: Abuja International Film Festival
 Jury: Zuma International Film Festival 
 Member: Advisory Council for African International Film Festival, 2013
 Member: Steering Committee, Motion Picture Council of Nigeria (MOPICON), 2007
 Founding Member: Conference of Motion Picture Practitioners of Nigeria (CMPPN)

See also
 List of Nigerian film producers

References

Living people
Yoruba filmmakers
Nigerian film directors
Nigerian male film actors
Nigerian film producers
Yoruba-language film directors
Nigerian writers
Nigerian documentary filmmakers
English-language film directors from Nigeria
1959 births